Fort Nelson Secondary is a public high school in Fort Nelson, British Columbia, part of School District 81 Fort Nelson. In July 2005, the first solar array as a part of the Solar 4 Schools program was installed at the school. It is a 10 kW array.

Athletics
In 2008, the senior boys basketball team made it to Single A provincials, the first time the boys have made it since the 1980s. The junior boys basketball team placed first in The Northern B.C Winter Games and Regionals. The school has a girls volleyball team ranging from juniors to senior.

External links 

 Fort Nelson Secondary School

References

High schools in British Columbia
Educational institutions in Canada with year of establishment missing